San Carlos District may refer to:

 San Carlos District, Bongará, in Bongará Province, Amazonas Region, Peru
 San Carlos District, Panama, in the West Panamá Province in Panama
 San Carlos District, Tarrazú, in Tarrazú (canton), San José Province, Costa Rica

See also
San Carlos (disambiguation)

District name disambiguation pages